The Clontarf, an immigration clipper ship, sailed from England to New Zealand between 1858 and 1860 on commission for the Canterbury Provincial Council, the governing body of Canterbury Province. Sailing under the flag of Willis, Gann and Co, it set out on its first voyage from Plymouth on 20 September 1858, and after a journey of 105 days arrived at Lyttelton, New Zealand on 5 January 1859 with 412 immigrants. Six infants and one adult died on the journey, plus there was a still-birth.

With one successful run complete it returned to England to collect its next passengers. On 30 November 1859 the Clontarf left London with 430 people on board. This voyage met with unforgiving bad weather, and a rampant plague of measles, whooping cough and tropical diseases swept mercilessly through the ship. It arrived at Lyttelton on 16 March 1860 with many fatalities. On a normal voyage for immigration ship of that time it was expected that up to five people might die from frailty, accident or birth at sea. On the second voyage of the Clontarf 41 people died: five adults and 36 children. This would give the Clontarf her infamy. Due to her reputation, prospective immigrants chose not to sail on her, and she was officially dismissed of her duties of ferrying immigrants to New Zealand in 1861.

Notable passengers

1858/59 journey
John Acland (1823–1904), farmer and politician
Edward Sealy (1839–1903), surveyor, photographer and farmer
William Gapes (1822-1903), pioneer and namesake of Gapes Valley

References 

 The Voyages of the Clontarf'' – Marolyn Diver (Dornie Publishing New Zealand 2011  )
 Archives New Zealand. 
 Ancestry.com ARRIVAL OF THE SHIP CLONTARF Lyttelton Times, 17 March 1860
 

 External links 
 
 Ancestry.com ARRIVAL OF THE SHIP CLONTARF Lyttelton Times'', 17 March 1860
 Passenger list of the 1859–1860 voyage

Clippers